The UK Rock & Metal Albums Chart is a record chart which ranks the best-selling rock and heavy metal albums in the United Kingdom. Compiled and published by the Official Charts Company, the data is based on each album's weekly physical sales, digital downloads and streams. In 1997, there were 17 albums that topped the 52 published charts. The first number-one album of the year was the self-titled debut album by Garbage, which spent the first three weeks of the year atop the chart. The final number-one album of the year was the Queen compilation album Queen Rocks, which spent the last four weeks of the year (and the first one of 1998) at number one.

The most successful album on the UK Rock & Metal Albums Chart in 1997 was No Doubt's third studio album Tragic Kingdom, which spent a total of 13 weeks at number one over four different spells. It was also the best-selling rock album of the year, ranking 26th in the UK End of Year Albums Chart. Led Zeppelin spent eight weeks at number one in 1997 – seven with Remasters and one with BBC Sessions – Queen's Queen Rocks was number one for six weeks, and Skunk Anansie's Stoosh topped the chart for five weeks. Three albums – Garbage's self-titled debut album, Glow by Reef and The Colour and the Shape by Foo Fighters – were number one for three weeks each, while two albums – Jon Bon Jovi's second solo album Destination Anywhere and Green Day's fifth studio album Nimrod – both spent two weeks at number one during the year.

Chart history

See also
1997 in British music
List of UK Rock & Metal Singles Chart number ones of 1997

References

External links
Official UK Rock & Metal Albums Chart Top 40 at the Official Charts Company
The Official UK Top 40 Rock Albums at BBC Radio 1

1997 in British music
United Kingdom Rock and Metal Albums
1997